The Frank Putnam Flint Fountain, also known as the Flint Memorial, is a monument commemorating Frank Putnam Flint, who was a United States Senator from California, in Los Angeles. It is located on the south lawn of Los Angeles City Hall facing 1st Street.

References

External links

 

Civic Center, Los Angeles
Fountains in California
Monuments and memorials in Los Angeles
Outdoor sculptures in Greater Los Angeles
Sculptures of men in California